Rajeev Ram was the defending champion but chose not to participate.

Malek Jaziri won the title, defeating Stéphane Robert 5–7, 6–3, 7–6(7–5) in the final.

Seeds

Draw

Finals

Top half

Bottom half

References
 Main Draw
 Qualifying Draw

Jalisco Open - Singles